The Royal Institute of the Architects of Ireland founded in 1839, is the "competent authority for architects and professional body for Architecture in the Republic of Ireland."

The RIAI's purpose is "to uphold the highest standards in architecture and to provide impartial and authoritative advice and information in issues affecting architects, the built environment and society." The RIAI's primary roles are in the areas of: Protecting the consumer; Promoting architecture; Supporting architects and architectural technologists; and Regulating architects. The institute is governed by a 26-member council.

Activities 

In addition to providing a range of services to the public, to members and to the State, the RIAI operates annual design awards, and is responsible for awarding the RIAI Gold Medal. This prize is awarded every three years to the best building completed in a given three-year period. The RIAI also awards the James Gandon Medal for 'lifetime achievement' in architecture. The inaugural award was made to Dr. Ronald Tallon of Scott Tallon Walker on 23 November 2010 by Minister for Tourism, Culture and Sport, Mary Hanafin, TD.

In addition, the RIAI is involved in architectural education and organises an annual student competition, The RIAI Student Excellence award (formerly the RIAI Travelling Scholarship) supported by Scott Tallon Walker Architects. The competition is open to final year students at the seven schools of architecture on the island of Ireland. They also award other prizes, such as the Deirdre O'Connor Medal which is awarded to the candidate with the best results in the Examination in Professional Practice.

Membership 

The RIAI operates three grades of membership relating architects or architectural graduates: Fellowship, Membership and Architectural Graduate. Members of the three ranks are entitled to use the affixes FRIAI (Fellows), MRIAI(Members) and RIAI (ArchTech) (Architectural Technologist).

Fellowship is awarded by the RIAI Council to existing Members according to specific rules.

Membership is the standard level for architects in the Republic of Ireland. It is open to those who have demonstrated competence to the level of the RIAI Standard of Knowledge Skill and Competence for Professional Practice as an architect. For those who have been deemed eligible for professional membership but who are not eligible to benefit from 'automatic' recognition under EU regulations the MRIAI(IRL) affix is used instead of MRIAI.

Architectural Graduate membership is open to all graduates of recognised five-year architecture programmes.

Criticism 

There are concerns about the RIAI having a monopoly on aspects of architecture in the Republic of Ireland. Procedures for registration are sometimes criticised as unfair and unaffordable. The Competition Authority of Ireland had recommended the creation of an Architects Council of Ireland, to be independent of the RIAI, but the 2007 Act promoted the RIAI as the registration body, albeit with various safeguards.

The lack of any meaningful challenge by the RIAI to the what is sometimes described as the antiquated Irish Planning and Building Control systems, which has allegedly allowed inherent inefficiencies and corruption to go unabated, thereby inadvertently contravening the institute's own stated goals of "Protecting the Consumer" and "Supporting architects". There is no public information available regarding the sanctioning of members that have contravened the RIAI Code of Practice, which might be said to undermine the institute's authority.

The RIAI has been accused of misleading the public about legislative issues concerning the provision of architectural services and about registration cost. The RIAI frequently omits to inform the press and members of the public that it is not an offence, and is legal, to propose architectural services without being registered with the RIAI.  Many so-called "non-registered architects" have denounced the regulator's attitude - consisting of undermining and criticising architectural services provided by professionals not registered with the RIAI. In 2010, the RIAI was found guilty of discrimination against non-RIAI professionals when the Broadcasting Authority of Ireland investigated a radio advertising campaign comparing non-RIAI professionals to incompetent practitioners. The Institute had to apologise on RTÉ and the advertising campaign was banned.

Unregistered users, at least once from an IP address held by the RIAI, allegedly attempted to remove information from the present Wikipedia article, and to include possibly biased and non-referenced content.

See also
Professional requirements for architects
Architectural Association of Ireland
Architects' Alliance of Ireland
 Architecture of Ireland
 Architecture Ireland Magazine

References

External links 

 

RIAI
Learned societies of Ireland
Professional associations based in Ireland
Professional certification in architecture
Architecture-related professional associations
1839 establishments in Ireland
Seanad nominating bodies